Hypena conscitalis is a moth of the family Erebidae first described by Francis Walker in 1866. It is found throughout Africa, from Senegal to South Africa, in South and South-East Asia as well as in Australia and on some Pacific and Indian Ocean islands (Sri Lanka).

Description
Its wingspan is about 20–25 mm. Forewings much broader. The outer margin less oblique. Raised tufts are slight. Forewings have a grey fascia on costal area. There is a black speck found at end of cell. The oblique line further from the base, which is slightly curved and with a grey line beyond it more prominent and curved.

They larvae feed on Desmodium intortum (Fabaceae).

References

conscitalis
Moths described in 1866
Owlet moths of Africa
Moths of Asia
Moths of Oceania